Mater Dei Hospital (MDH), also known simply as Mater Dei, is an acute Catholic founded charitable hospital that provides health services and specialist services. It is a Public hospital located in Bulawayo, Zimbabwe. Mater Dei Hospital is owned and operated by board of trustees which include the Franciscan Missionaries of the Divine Motherhood.

History 
Mater Dei Hospital is founded in 1950s by the Franciscan nuns. It is a Catholic health institution led by the board of trustees.

Charlene, Princess of Monaco,  Fromer Olympic swimmer was born in 1978 at Mater Dei.

Services 
Services provided at the Mater Dei hospital include:

Accident and Emergency 
Intensive Care Unit
High-dependency unit
 Paediatrics
 Surgical
 Obstetrics
 X-ray.

References 

Buildings and structures in Bulawayo
Hospitals in Zimbabwe